18th Brigade may refer to:

Australia
 18th Brigade (Australia)

United Kingdom
 18th Infantry Brigade (United Kingdom)
 18th Mounted Brigade (United Kingdom)
 Artillery Brigades
 18th Brigade Royal Field Artillery
 XVIII Brigade, Royal Horse Artillery (T.F.)

United States
 18th Aviation Brigade (United States)
 18th Engineer Brigade (United States)
 18th Fires Brigade (United States)
 18th Military Police Brigade (United States)

Yugoslavia
 18th (Croatian) Eastern Bosnian Brigade, an irregular formation of Yugoslav partisans which opposed German forces during World War II

See also
 18th Army
 XVIII Corps
 18th Division
 18th Regiment
 18th Battalion
 18 Squadron